The Merrimack Warriors football program is the intercollegiate American football team for Merrimack College located in the U.S. state of Massachusetts. The team competes in the NCAA Division I Football Championship Subdivision (FCS) and are members of the Northeast Conference. Merrimack's first football team was fielded in 1996. The team plays its home games at the 4,000 seat Duane Stadium in North Andover, Massachusetts. The Warriors are coached by Dan Curran.

History

Classifications
1996: NCAA Division III
1997–2018: NCAA Division II
2019–present: NCAA Division I FCS

Conference memberships
1985–1995: Independent
1996: Eastern Collegiate Football Conference
1997–2000: Eastern Football Conference
2001–2018: Northeast-10 Conference
2019–present: Northeast Conference

Division II Playoffs results
Merrimack has made one appearance in the NCAA Division II football playoffs; their record is 1–1.

Notable former players
 Samuel Cooper 2018-19 - Houston Texans
 Erick Browne - Houston Gamblers (2022)
 Jovan Grant - Los Angeles Rams
 Clay Legault 2016-21 - Philadelphia Stars (2022)
 Caleb Holden 2017-21 - Kansas City Chiefs/Toronto Argonauts
 Shawn Page - 2021 - Orlando Guardians XFL

Future non-conference opponents 
Announced schedules as of January 17, 2023

References

External links
 

 
American football teams established in 1996
1996 establishments in Massachusetts